Ian Hamilton may refer to:

 Ian Hamilton (British Army officer) (1853–1947), British general
 Ian Hamilton (cricketer) (1906–1992), New Zealand cricketer
 Ian Hamilton (advocate) (1925–2022), Scottish lawyer
 Ian Hamilton (critic) (1938–2001), British critic, poet, literary magazine publisher and editor
 Ian Hamilton (footballer) (1940–2021), English footballer who played for Bristol Rovers, Exeter City & Newport County
 Ian Hamilton (writer) (born 1946), Canadian author of the Ava Lee mystery novel series
 Ian Hamilton (footballer, born 1950), English footballer, known as "Chico"
 Ian Hamilton (footballer, born 1956), English football midfielder with Darlington, La Louvière and Liège
 Ian Hamilton (footballer, born 1967), English football midfielder with West Bromwich Albion and Sheffield United
 Ian Hamilton (baseball) (born 1995), baseball player
 Abigail Austen (born 1964), previously known as Ian Hamilton, a transsexual woman and the first officer in the British Army to complete gender reassignment

See also
Iain Hamilton (disambiguation)